The German Ideology (German: Die deutsche Ideologie, sometimes written as A Critique of the German Ideology) is a set of manuscripts originally written by Karl Marx and Friedrich Engels around April or early May 1846. Marx and Engels did not find a publisher, but the work was later retrieved and published for the first time in 1932 by David Riazanov through the Marx-Engels Institute in Moscow. The first part of the book is an exposition of Marx's "materialist conception of history", though recent research for the new Marx Engels Gesamtausgabe (MEGA) indicates that much of the 'system' in this part was created afterwards by the Marx-Engels Institute in Moscow in the 1930s, from the set of manuscripts written by Karl Marx and Friedrich Engels. Much of the rest of the book consists of many satirical polemics against Bruno Bauer, other Young Hegelians, and Max Stirner's The Ego and Its Own (1844).

Text

The text itself was written by Marx and Engels in Brussels in 1845 and 1846 but it was not published until 1932. The Preface and some of the alterations and additions are in Marx's hand. The bulk of the manuscript is in Engels' hand, except for Chapter V of Volume II and some passages of Chapter III of Volume I which are in Joseph Weydemeyer's hand. Chapter V in Volume II was written by Moses Hess and edited by Marx and Engels. The text in German runs to around 700 pages.

General outline
Marx and Engels argue that humans distinguish themselves from animals as soon as they begin to produce their means of subsistence; what individuals are coincides with their production in both how and what they produce. The nature of individuals depends on the material conditions determining their production.

How far the productive forces of a nation are developed is shown by the degree to which the division of labor has been carried. Also, there is a direct link between division of labor and forms of ownership.

The ruling class, in ruling the material force of society, is simultaneously the ruling intellectual force of society. They regulate the production and distribution of ideas of their age. As the ruling class changes with time, so too do the ideals and the new ruling class must instill upon its society its own ideas which will become universal. The ruling ideas are thought to be the universal interest. However, it is an illusion that the ideas of the ruling class are the communal interests. This system will forever remain in place so long as society is organized around the need for a ruling class.

To illustrate this theoretical framework, Marx draws on his formulation of base and superstructure. Historical development is the reflection of changes in the economic and material relations of the base. When the base changes, a revolutionary class becomes the new ruling class that forms the superstructure. During revolution, the revolutionary class makes certain that its ideas appeal to humanity in general so that after a successful revolution these ideas appear natural and universal. These ideas, which the super-structural elements of society propagate, then become the governing ideology of the historical period. Furthermore, the governing ideology mystifies the economic relations of society and therefore places the proletariat in a state of false consciousness that serves to reproduce the working class.

"Morality, religion, metaphysics, all the rest of ideology and their corresponding forms of consciousness no longer retain the semblance of independence; they have no history and no development; but men, developing their material production and their material intercourse, alter, along with their real existence, their thinking and the products of their collective thinking."

This approach allows us to cease understanding history as a collection of dead facts or an imagined activity of subjects.

See also

German idealism
The Indian Ideology and The Californian Ideology, whose titles were inspired by The German Ideology
Lumpenproletariat
Marxist philosophy
Sociology of knowledge
Young Hegelians
Young Marx

Footnotes

Further reading

 Terrell Carver and Daniel Blank, Marx and Engels's German Ideology Manuscripts: Presentation and Analysis of the "Feuerbach Chapter." New York: Palgrave Macmillan, 2014.
 Terrell Carver and Daniel Blank, Political History of the Editions of Marx and Engels's "German Ideology Manuscripts." New York: Palgrave Macmillan, 2014.
 Margaret A. Rose, Reading the Young Marx and Engels: Poetry, Parody, and the Censor. London: Croon Helm, 1978.

External links 
The German Ideology (Marxists.org)
The German Ideology, English-language edition of book published by Progress Publishers, PDF format.

1932 non-fiction books
Books by Karl Marx and Friedrich Engels
Historical materialism